The Nautor 42 was designed by Sparkman and Stephens and built by Nautor's Swan and first launched in 1976.

External links
 Nautor Swan

References

Sailing yachts
Motorsailers
Keelboats
1970s sailboat type designs
Sailboat types built by Nautor Swan
Sailboat type designs by Sparkman and Stephens